In theoretical computer science, the CAP theorem, also named Brewer's theorem after computer scientist Eric Brewer, states that any distributed data store can provide only two of the following three guarantees:
 Consistency Every read receives the most recent write or an error.
 Availability Every request receives a (non-error) response, without the guarantee that it contains the most recent write.
 Partition tolerance The system continues to operate despite an arbitrary number of messages being dropped (or delayed) by the network between nodes.

When a network partition failure happens, it must be decided whether to do one of the following:
 cancel the operation and thus decrease the availability but ensure consistency
 proceed with the operation and thus provide availability but risk inconsistency.

Thus, if there is a network partition, one has to choose between consistency or availability. Note that consistency as defined in the CAP theorem is quite different from the consistency guaranteed in ACID database transactions.

Eric Brewer argues that the often-used "two out of three" concept can be somewhat misleading because system designers need only to sacrifice consistency or availability in the presence of partitions, but that in many systems partitions are rare.

Explanation 
No distributed system is safe from network failures, thus network partitioning generally has to be tolerated. In the presence of a partition, one is then left with two options: consistency or availability. When choosing consistency over availability, the system will return an error or a time out if particular information cannot be guaranteed to be up to date due to network partitioning. When choosing availability over consistency, the system will always process the query and try to return the most recent available version of the information, even if it cannot guarantee it is up to date due to network partitioning.

In the absence of a partition, both availability and consistency can be satisfied.

Database systems designed with traditional ACID guarantees in mind such as RDBMS choose consistency over availability, whereas systems designed around the BASE philosophy, common in the NoSQL movement for example, choose availability over consistency.

History 

According to University of California, Berkeley computer scientist Eric Brewer, the theorem first appeared in autumn 1998. It was published as the CAP principle in 1999 and presented as a conjecture by Brewer at the 2000 Symposium on Principles of Distributed Computing (PODC). In 2002, Seth Gilbert and Nancy Lynch of MIT published a formal proof of Brewer's conjecture, rendering it a theorem.

In 2012, Brewer clarified some of his positions, including why the often-used "two out of three" concept can be somewhat misleading because system designers only need to sacrifice consistency or availability in the presence of partitions; partition management and recovery techniques exist. Brewer also noted the different definition of consistency used in the CAP theorem relative to the definition used in ACID.

A similar theorem stating the trade-off between consistency and availability in distributed systems was published by Birman and Friedman in 1996. Birman and Friedman's result restricted this lower bound to non-commuting operations.

The PACELC theorem, introduced in 2010, builds on CAP by stating that even in the absence of partitioning, there is another trade-off between latency and consistency. PACELC means, if partition (P) happens, the trade-off is between availability (A) and consistency (C); Else (E), the trade-off is between latency (L) and consistency (C).

Blockchain technology often sacrifices immediate consistency for availability and partition tolerance. By requiring a specific number of "confirmations", Blockchain consensus algorithms are basically reduced to eventual consistency.

See also 
 Fallacies of distributed computing
 PACELC theorem
 Paxos (computer science)
 Raft (computer science)
 Zooko's triangle

References

External links 
 CAP Twelve Years Later: How the "Rules" Have Changed Brewer's 2012 article on conflict-free replicated data types (CRDT)
 Spanner, TrueTime and the CAP Theorem
 A Critique of the CAP Theorem
 Please stop calling databases CP or AP Kleppmann's 2015 blog post corresponding with the publication of "A Critique of the CAP Theorem"

Distributed computing